Mega Man ZX Advent, known in Japan as , is an action-platform video game developed by Inti Creates and published by Capcom for the Nintendo DS handheld game console. The game was first released in Japan on July 12, 2007; in North America on October 23, 2007; in Europe on February 29, 2008; and in Australia on March 5, 2008. 

Part of the Mega Man franchise, the game is a sequel to Mega Man ZX. ZX Advent follows two new protagonists, Grey and Ashe, as they battle with various enemy "Mega Men", the infamous Model W, and their own destinies. The gameplay sees a multitude of expansions, including twice as many playable forms. The North American localization also includes a full English voice cast.

The game was re-released as part of the Mega Man Zero/ZX Legacy Collection,  on February 25, 2020 and February 27, 2020 in Japan, for PlayStation 4, Xbox One, Nintendo Switch and Microsoft Windows.

Plot

Story 
The story focuses on the chosen wielder of a Biometal, known in Japan as Live Metal (ライブメタル Raibumetaru), advanced technology that is capable of Mega-Merging with its wielder and absorbing DNA from defeated enemies. The story varies slightly depending on the character the player chooses to play: if Grey is chosen by the player, the story begins with Grey waking up in an Abandoned Laboratory; if Ashe is chosen, the story begins with Ashe who is the member of Hunters. The remainder of the story follows the same storyline.

Characters 

Advent features a very large cast of characters both new to the series and returning from the first ZX, including the two main protagonists, eight Mega Men, the Sage Trinity, and eight Pseudoroids. A majority of the cast is playable by copying their forms with A-Trans, and thus, these characters are outlined in detail below in the corresponding sections.

 The Sage Trinity are the ruling triumvirate of Legion. They were originally human, but in order to continue ruling Legion extended their lives through cybernetics. Unbeknownst to Thomas and Mikhail, Albert is the original creator of Model W and betrays them in order to gather various Model Ws in the world to form the ultimate Biometal, Ouroboros. Using it, he intends to rule a new world as its god. Their names are a reference to Dr. Thomas Light, Dr. Mikhail Cossack and Dr. Albert Wily, the three named roboticists from the original Mega Man games.
 Prometheus and Pandora are two characters returning from the first ZX. In this title, their origins are revealed as sibling creations of Master Albert. In order to enforce their loyalty, Albert gave them limited lifespans that require them to return to capsules to rest. Since their creation, they have been ordered to seek out the strongest Mega Man, but their bitterness toward their creator has led them to create their own agenda. They hope to use Grey/Ashe to bring them closer to Albert and, ultimately, destroy him and everything he has ever worked on.

Mega Men 
Humans/Reploids chosen as the Biometals' "Biomatch" are regarded as Mega Men (regardless of the person's gender). Several enemy Mega Men appear throughout the course of Advent who possess the Biometals used from the first ZX. By defeating them in battle, Grey/Ashe is able to copy their forms via A-Trans, but they never actually attain the Biometals.

  is the Biomatch for Model H, the Wind Mega Man. Aeolus is a perfectionist and thus very condescending. He views the world's chaos as a result of ignorance. Model H is modeled after Sage Harpuia of the Mega Man Zero series.
  is the Biomatch for Model F, the Flame Mega Man. She was originally a soldier for a country destroyed by Mavericks, and plays the Game of Destiny to speed up the evolutionary process. Model F is modeled after Fighting Fefnir of the Mega Man Zero series.
  is the Biomatch for Model L, the Ice Mega Man. On the surface, Thetis is a kind, normal boy, but hides a radically environmentalist agenda. Model L is modeled after Fairy Leviathan of the Mega Man Zero series.
  is the Biomatch for Model P, the Shadow Mega Man. Siarnaq is exceedingly cold and machinelike in his demeanor, always speaking in a robotic monotone, which is apparently due to incidents in his past, which include betrayal and being left for dead. Model P is modeled after Hidden Phantom of the Mega Man Zero series.
These two are also seeking Model W to destroy it, and after a misunderstanding, they become allies with Grey/Ashe, aiding in the infiltration of Ouroboros.

Pseudoroids 
The eight Pseudoroids can also become playable upon destroying them in battle. Although the Biometal forms all use similar abilities (such as dashing and wall climbing), the Pseudoroid forms vary greatly in basic movement and abilities. There are two Pseudoroids to represent each element (fire, ice, and electricity) and two with no element, akin to the first ZX title.

Gameplay 

Many of the elements from Mega Man ZX return, including the 2D world and several missions and collection side-quests, as well as much of the gameplay. The players begin the game in their normal forms and can revert to them at any time. Like other games in the ZX series, the game tries to inject metroidvania concepts into the level design, with more exploration elements than the main Mega Man series.

Other features 
Advent features several difficulty settings. Beginner simplifies the gameplay by weakening enemy's defenses and attacks and disabling instant-defeat obstacles among other things. By completing the game on Normal, Expert mode can be unlocked, and upon completing it, an extended ending can be viewed. Expert Mode also limits the gameplay for the player in being able to collect only one Sub-Tank, and removing all the Life-Up and Bio-Metal Upgrades.

The dual screen received some upgrades where it now has a secondary screen of allowing the player to switch between forms instantly without having to use the transformation button to help select the form the player wishes to use. Also the weapon energy system has been modified where now all forms share the weapon energy meter, but with the new benefit that aside from weapon energy capsules, the meter can now slowly refill itself over time. Like with the Life Meter it starts off small, but collecting the Bio-Metal Upgrades can expand the maximum weapon energy meter.

The Database from the first ZX returns. Eighty-five secret disks are scattered throughout the game with descriptions and images of the characters and enemies in the game. Several special disks are also featured, including an image of the infamous North American box art for the original NES game. Along with the secret disks, there are several equippable chip items that can enhance the players abilities, such as preventing the effects of wind and ice on the player's footing. A hidden room in the game will also give the player special items for each month of the year.

Furthermore, 24 medals can be collected depending on how the eight Pseudoroids are defeated in battle. Gold, silver, and bronze medals can be received for each Pseudoroid depending on the difficulty of the task involved. Tasks sometimes include what attack or form the enemy is defeated with, what part of their body is attacked, or the amount of time they're defeated in.

The game features a few unlockable mini-games. Quiz Advent requires the player to identify twenty characters with three visual obstructions. A mini-game from the first title, Gem Buster is now only playable between two players over an ad hoc network. Two boss mini-games called Survival Road and Boss Battle can be unlocked. Finally, Mega Man a (the "a" standing for "ancient" or "antique") is an imitation of the original 8-bit Mega Man games on the Nintendo Entertainment System using ZX characters and music. The Model a character can also be used in the main game as a result of New Game Plus, but only if the player obtained the 24 aforementioned medals in the previous game, but unlike the other forms, it can only be accessed with the transformation button, instead of the dual-screen transformation ability.

In Mega Man Zero/ZX Legacy Collection, much like the original Mega Man ZX, the original dual-screen features have also been changed to a support screen, where its position is based on the setting the player chooses. In addition the new Casual Scenario Mode replaces Beginner Mode, which is activated from the main menu of the collection when selecting this game which serves the same purpose.

Audio 
Rockman ZX Advent Soundtrack -ZXA Tunes- is the second remastered soundtrack album to be released for the Mega Man ZX series released on August 30, 2007 by Inti Creates.  Unlike the first soundtrack, ZX Tunes, which was first released in limited numbers, ZXA Tunes was released nationwide immediately in Japan. Capcom's online store also provided a limited edition bonus for pre-ordering the soundtrack: a ZX Advent mousepad featuring ZXA heroine Ashe "crashing" in ZX hero Vent's pad.

Rockman ZX Soundsketch "ZX Gigamix" is the third album to be created for the Mega Man ZX series, released on April 30, 2008 by Inti Creates. Among the album are Soundsketches and ZX portraits; these are drama tracks that provide insight to events in the Mega Man ZX series. Composer Ippo Yamada explains a Soundsketch as "when you listen carefully in a room that seems silent, you can hear all sorts of sounds like the hum of appliances, the tick of a clock and the environment outside the window."

Reception 

Critical reaction to the game has been mostly positive. IGN stated, "It's a fairly long and deep experience, though it's by no means a perfect game. However, the good certainly outweighs the bad, and we can't help but recommend this game as a result." GameSpot cited the main problem as the game's difficulty being a bit too high for the casual gamer. Game Informer magazine gave the game an overall score of 7 out of 10 praising the easier game navigation and the ability to transform into boss characters after defeating them and they felt that Mega Man ZX Advent was entertaining because of how the game sticks to the basics like the classic Mega Man games.

Mega Man ZX Advent was the tenth-best-selling game in Japan during its release week at 21,379 units sold. 63,977 units of the game were sold in the region by the end of 2007.

References

External links 
 Official website 
 Official blog  

 

Side-scrolling video games
Side-scrolling platform games
Action video games
2007 video games
Inti Creates games
Metroidvania games
Nintendo DS games
Nintendo DS-only games
Video game sequels
Video games featuring female protagonists
Multiplayer and single-player video games
Video games developed in Japan
Video games scored by Ippo Yamada
ZX Advent